Gluconobacter thailandicus is a species of bacteria, first isolated in Thailand, hence its name. Its type strain is F149-1(T) (=BCC 14116(T) =NBRC 100600(T) =JCM 12310(T) =TISTR 1533(T) =PCU 225(T)).

References

Further reading

External links

LPSN
Type strain of Gluconobacter thailandicus at BacDive -  the Bacterial Diversity Metadatabase

Rhodospirillales
Bacteria described in 2005